Picture of Health is the debut album by Canadian rock band Headstones. The music video for the "Cemetery" track is featured on the Canadian DVD release of the movie Hard Core Logo, starring Hugh Dillon and was also featured on the Canadian VHS release of Dance Me Outside, also starring Dillon. On October 26, 2018, the Headstones released a remastered reissue of the album to celebrate its 25th anniversary. The band is promoting the reissue of the album with a tour in which they are performing the Picture of Heath album in its entirety.

Track listing

Certifications
On May 7, 1999, Picture of Health was certified platinum by Music Canada.

References

External links 
Headstoner

1993 debut albums
Headstones (band) albums
MCA Records albums
Albums recorded at Metalworks Studios